Capilano was a federal electoral district in British Columbia, Canada,  that was represented in the House of Commons of Canada from 1968 to 1988.

This riding was created in 1966 from parts of Coast—Capilano riding.

It was abolished in 1987 when it was redistributed into Capilano—Howe Sound and North Vancouver ridings.

Members of Parliament

Election results

See also 
 List of Canadian federal electoral districts
 Past Canadian electoral districts

External links
Riding history from the Library of Parliament

Former federal electoral districts of British Columbia